Sam Hay may refer to:
 Sam Hay (footballer)
 Sam Hay (umpire)
 Sam Hay (chemist)